The 1992 NCAA Women's Division I Swimming and Diving Championships were contested at the 11th annual NCAA-sanctioned swim meet to determine the team and individual national champions of Division I women's collegiate swimming and diving in the United States. 

This year's events were hosted by the University of Texas at the Texas Swimming Center in Austin, Texas. 

Stanford upset hosts and two-time defending champions Texas to claim the team title, the Cardinal's third.

Team standings
Note: Top 10 only
(H) = Hosts
(DC) = Defending champions
Full results

See also
List of college swimming and diving teams

References

NCAA Division I Swimming And Diving Championships
NCAA Division I Swimming And Diving Championships
NCAA Division I Women's Swimming and Diving Championships
1992 in women's swimming
1992 in women's diving